Berquist Ridge is a curving ridge,  long, trending west from its juncture with Madey Ridge in the Neptune Range, Pensacola Mountains. It was mapped by the United States Geological Survey from surveys and from U.S. Navy air photos, 1956–66, and named by the Advisory Committee on Antarctic Names for Robert M. Berquist, a photographer at Ellsworth Station, winter 1958.

References 

Ridges of Queen Elizabeth Land